The 2017 Paul Hunter Classic was a professional ranking snooker tournament that took place in August 2017 at the Stadthalle in Fürth, Germany. It was the third ranking event of the 2017/2018 season. The tournament is named in honour of former snooker professional, Paul Hunter.

Mark Selby was the defending champion, but he lost 1–4 to Michael White in the fourth round. White went on to beat Shaun Murphy 4–2 in the final, capturing his second world ranking title.

Prize fund

The breakdown of prize money for this year is shown below:
 Winner: £20,000
 Runner up: £10,000
 Semifinals: £4,500
 Quarterfinals: £3,000
 Last 16: £1,725
 Last 32: £1,000
 Last 64: £600
 Total: £100,000

Main rounds

Top half

Section 1

Section 2

Section 3

Section 4

Bottom half

Section 5

Section 6

Section 7

Section 8

Finals

Notes

Final

Amateur pre-qualifying
These matches were played in Fürth on 22–24 August 2017. All matches were best of 7 frames.

Round 1

Round 2

Round 3

Century breaks

Main rounds centuries
Total: 24

 143  Mark Selby
 142  Dominic Dale
 132  Paul Davison
 132  Kyren Wilson
 124  Fergal O'Brien
 123, 120, 104  Mark Joyce
 123  Martin O'Donnell
 122  Mark King
 119, 102, 100  Jamie Jones

 115  Nigel Bond
 114  Jak Jones
 109  Kurt Maflin
 107, 106  Gary Wilson
 107, 106  Ben Woollaston
 105  Liam Highfield
 104  Shaun Murphy
 103  Tom Ford
 100  Alan McManus

Amateur pre-qualifying stage centuries
 117  Ashley Carty
 107, 103  Barry Pinches 
 105  Jamie Cope 
 102  Andy Hicks 
 102  Adam Stefanow 
 101  Louis Heathcote

References

2017
2017 in snooker
2017 in German sport
August 2017 sports events in Germany